The Felixstowe F.1 was a British experimental flying boat designed and developed by Lieutenant Commander John Cyril Porte RN at the naval air station, Felixstowe based on the Curtiss H-4 with a new hull. Its design led to a range of successful larger flying boats that was assistance in promoting Britain as a leader in this field of aviation.

Development
Before the war Porte worked with American aircraft designer Glenn Curtiss on a trans-atlantic flying boat. Due to the start of the Great War he returned to England, eventually to command of the naval air station at Felixstowe, Suffolk. Porte decided that the original Curtiss flying-boats that the Royal Navy acquired could be improved and a number of modifications to in-service flying-boats were made. The modifications had a mixed result so Porte using the experience gained, developed with his Chief Technical Officer John Douglas Rennie, a new single-step hull known as the Porte I.

The Porte I hull used the wings and tail unit of an original H-4 (No.3580) powered by two Hispano-Suiza 8 engines; the new flying boat was designated the Felixstowe F.1. During trials of the F.1 two further steps were added to the hull and a deeper V-shape which greatly improved the performance on takeoff and landing. Porte went on to design a similar hull, the Porte II for the larger Curtiss H-12 flying boat, which became the Felixstowe F.2.

Operators

Royal Naval Air Service
RNAS Felixstowe
 Royal Air Force
Seaplane Experimental Station, Felixstowe - Flying school

Specifications

See also
 British Anzani

References

Notes

Bibliography

External links

Sons of Our Empire: Film of the Royal Naval Air Service at Felixstowe, including a Curtiss Model H-2 and prototype Felixstowe F.1 (No. 3580) fitted with Anzani engines, Porte and Commodore of Harwich, George C. Cayley RN returning from a flight in a Felixstowe F.1, about August 1916.
"The Felixstowe Flying-Boats - part 1" a 1955 Flight article
"The Felixstowe Flying-Boats - part 2" a 1955 Flight article
"F-Boats - A Postscript by an Ex-pilot" a 1956 Flight article on the Felixstowe flying boats
Felixstowe Flying-Boats

1910s British patrol aircraft
Flying boats
F.1
Biplanes
Aircraft first flown in 1916
Twin piston-engined tractor aircraft